The 2002 United States House of Representatives elections in South Carolina were held on November 5, 2002 to select six Representatives for two-year terms from the state of South Carolina.  The primary elections for the Democrats and the Republicans were held on June 11 and the runoff elections were held two weeks later on June 25.  All five incumbents who ran were re-elected and the open seat in the 3rd congressional district was retained by the Republicans.  The composition of the state delegation remained four Republicans and two Democrats.

Overview

District 1

This conservative district, which stretches along coastal South Carolina from the North Carolina to Charleston County and includes Myrtle Beach and some of Charleston, was represented by Republican Congressman Henry E. Brown, Jr. since his initial election in 2000. Seeking a second term, Brown faced only United Citizens candidate James Dunn and Natural Law candidate Joe Innella, whom he dispatched easily.

District 2

Initially elected in a 2001 special election, incumbent Republican Congressman Joe Wilson sought a full term. This conservative district, which spans from the southern coast of South Carolina to Columbia in central South Carolina, easily elected Wilson in 2001. This year, he faced only United Citizens candidate Mark Whittington and Libertarian nominee Jim Legg, whom he crushed in a landslide.

District 3

When incumbent Republican Congressman Lindsey Graham declined to seek a fifth term, instead opting to run for Senate, an open seat was created. South Carolina State Representative J. Gresham Barrett entered the fray and emerged as the Republican nominee. George Brightharp, the 2000 Democratic nominee for this seat, ran again, but was crushed in the general election by Barrett.

District 4

In this staunchly conservative district based in Spartanburg and Greenville, incumbent Republican Congressman Jim DeMint since his initial election in 1998. Seeking a third term, DeMint faced Democratic candidate Peter Ashy and Natural Law candidate C. Faye Walters. DeMint ultimately defeated both candidates to secure another term in Congress.

District 5

In this conservative-leaning district based in northern South Carolina, Democratic Congressman John Spratt has managed to maintain his popularity since he was first elected in 1982. This year proved to be no different, and Spratt, seeking an eleventh term, defeated Libertarian Doug Kendall and Constitution Party candidate Steve Lefemine in a landslide.

District 6

This district, the most liberal one in South Carolina, was crafted to ensure an African-American majority in it. Pulling from central South Carolina counties and from black-dominated areas in Charleston and Columbia, it achieved its purpose. Congressman Jim Clyburn, an African-American, has represented this district since 1993 and sought a sixth term in the general election. Clyburn took full advantage of the district's Democratic tendencies and steamrolled Republican Gary McLeod and Libertarian Craig Augenstein.

See also
South Carolina's congressional districts

References

External links
South Carolina Election Returns

2002
South Carolina
2002 South Carolina elections